Winnebago County is a county located in the U.S. state of Illinois. According to the 2020 census, it had a population of 285,350 making it the seventh most populous county in Illinois behind Cook County and its five surrounding collar counties. Its county seat is Rockford. Winnebago County is the central county of the Rockford Metropolitan Statistical Area.

History
Winnebago County was formed on January 16, 1836, out of Jo Daviess and LaSalle counties. It was named for the Winnebago Tribe of American Indians.  At the time the county was founded its inhabitants consisted almost entirely of New Englanders and New England transplants from upstate New York.  These were "Yankee" settlers, meaning they were descended from the English Puritans who settled New England during the early 1600s.  They made up virtually all of Winnebago County's inhabitants during the first several decades of its history.  In this regard the county was similar to most of the northern portion of the state of Illinois, and almost all of the neighboring state of Wisconsin.  After the conclusion of the Black Hawk War there was an additional surge of immigration from New England.  As a result of this heritage the inhabitants of Winnebago County considered themselves, and functioned as, a cultural expansion of early New England culture.  In the Presidential election of 1860, Abraham Lincoln won 3,985 votes in Winnebago County, whereas Stephen A. Douglas only won 817 votes.

Geography

Climate and weather

Major highways

  Interstate 39
  Interstate 90
  U.S. Highway 20
  U.S. Highway 51
  Illinois Route 2
  Illinois Route 70
  Illinois Route 75
  Illinois Route 173
  Illinois Route 251

Transit
 Beloit Transit
 Rockford Mass Transit District
 List of intercity bus stops in Illinois

Adjacent counties
 Rock County, Wisconsin (north)
 Boone County (east)
 DeKalb County (southeast)
 Ogle County (south)
 Stephenson County (west)
 Green County, Wisconsin (northwest)

Demographics

As of the 2010 census, there were 295,266 people, 115,501 households, and 76,854 families residing in the county. The racial makeup of the county was 77.4% white, 12.2% black or African American, 2.3% Asian, 0.3% American Indian, 4.9% from other races, and 2.8% from two or more races. Those of Hispanic or Latino origin made up 10.9% of the population. In terms of ancestry, 25.6% were German, 13.5% were Irish, 9.4% were American, 8.7% were Swedish, 8.3% were English, and 7.4% were Italian.

Of the 115,501 households, 33.1% had children under the age of 18 living with them, 47.3% were married couples living together, 14.0% had a female householder with no husband present, 33.5% were non-families, and 27.7% of all households were made up of individuals. The average household size was 2.52 and the average family size was 3.07. The median age was 38.3 years.

The median income for a household in the county was $47,198 and the median income for a family was $59,814. Males had a median income of $48,358 versus $32,103 for females. The per capita income for the county was $24,008. About 11.5% of families and 15.9% of the population were below the poverty line, including 25.0% of those under age 18 and 7.5% of those age 65 or over.

Communities

Cities
 Loves Park
 Rockford
 South Beloit

Villages

 Cherry Valley
 Durand
 Machesney Park
 New Milford
 Pecatonica
 Rockton
 Roscoe
 Winnebago

Census-designated place
 Lake Summerset

Unincorporated communities

 Alworth
 Argyle
 Harlem
 Harrison
 Kishwaukee
 Latham Park
 Seward
 Shirland
 Wempletown
 Westfield Corners

Townships
Winnebago County is divided into these townships:

 Burritt
 Cherry Valley
 Durand
 Harlem
 Harrison
 Laona
 Owen
 Pecatonica
 Rockford
 Rockton
 Roscoe
 Seward
 Shirland
 Winnebago

Former Settlement

 Camp Grant

Politics
Prior to 1992, Winnebago County was a Republican Party stronghold in presidential elections, only backing the Democratic Party candidates in the national landslides of 1936 & 1964. Since then, it became a swing county, backing the national winner in every presidential election from 1980 to 2012. In 2016, Hillary Clinton won the county by only 89 votes over Donald Trump, affected by the relatively large third-party vote that year.

See also

 National Register of Historic Places listings in Winnebago County, Illinois
 Winnebago County War Memorial

References
Specific

General

Further reading
   Includes numerous photos of c. 1904 Winnebago County schools.

External links
 
 Winnebago County Genealogy
 History of Winnebago County

 
1836 establishments in Illinois
Illinois counties
Illinois placenames of Native American origin
Populated places established in 1836